Nicolas Tommasini (born 1971) is a French business executive and entrepreneur.  He is currently the Founder & President of both Domaines & événements, the first French franchise and hospitality management company operating event estates in peri-urban countryside, and D&é Invest, which owns a number of such estates in France namely Domaine de la Thibaudière, Domaine de Vaujoly, Château des Barrenques or Château d’Aveny.

Education 
Tommasini earned a degree in Political Science from the Institut d’Etudes Politiques de Paris and an MSc in International Finance from the Lancaster University by 1993.

Career 
Tommasini started his career for transport & removal company AGS by launching subsidiaries in Africa and Eastern Europe, specifically managing and developing the Romanian subsidiary in Bucharest during 1995 through 1996.  In 1996 he took the position of Deputy to CEO of property manager Bazin S.A. in Paris.

Then in 1997, he joined Jean-Francois Ott at Orco Property Group in Prague and was responsible for the international development of the company.

In 2000 he developed and headed Orco Budapest and participated in the listing of Orco Property Group in Paris.

In the following years Tommasini and Ott founded the hotel group MaMaison Hotels & Residences which was developed across Central and Eastern Europe.  This process spearheaded Orco's international development most notably in Warsaw (2002), Bratislava (2003), and Moscow (2006).

In 2005 Tommasini was appointed to a Member of the Board at Orco Property Group.

Beginning in 2004 Tommasini and Ott developed Orco in Germany starting by acquiring one asset at a time.  They continued this process until they managed over 20 income producing assets in Berlin, specifically in the district of Prenzlaur Berg.  Later this developed into the privatization of GSG Berlin in 2006 which changed the profile of Orco Property Group by refocusing it towards Germany.

By 2009 Tommasini was Deputy CEO and Group CFO overlooking all financial functions, financial reporting, and the financial restructuring of the Group.  The climax came with the negotiated EUR 600 million bond equitization finalized in 2013.  As a result of this restructuring Tommasini became the COO and MD of Orco Germany, focusing on asset management and development of GSG Berlin along with Orco's main projects.

In 2014 Tommasini left Orco Property Group and founded Ott Properties with Jean-Francois Ott.

  Tommasini is responsible for risk management, investment execution, asset management, and development supervising in Prague, Berlin, and Paris.

References

Nicolas Tommasini at Domaines & évènements== External links ==
 Nicolas Tommasini at ottproperties.EU

Living people
1971 births
French businesspeople